Pope Innocent VI (1352–1362) created fifteen cardinals in three consistories.

Consistory on February 15, 1353

 Andouin Aubert, papal nephew, bishop of Maguelonne —  cardinal-priest of SS. Giovanni e Paolo, then (July 1361) cardinal-bishop of Ostia e Velletri, + May 10, 1363.

Consistory on December 23, 1356
 Élie de Saint-Yrieix, O.S.B., bishop of Uzès — cardinal-priest of SS. IV Coronati, then (May 1363) cardinal-bishop of Ostia e Velletri, + May 10, 1367.
 Francesco degli Atti, bishop of Florence — cardinal-priest of S. Marco, + August 25, 1361.
 Pierre de Monteruc, papal nephew, bishop elect of Pamplona —  cardinal-priest of S. Anastasia, + May 30, 1385.
 Guillaume Farinier, O.F.M., minister general of his order —  cardinal-priest of SS. Marcellino e Pietro, + June 17, 1361.
 Nicolás Rossell, O.P., inquisitor and provincial prior of Aragón —  cardinal-priest of S. Sisto, + March 28, 1362.
 Pierre de la Forêt, archbishop of Rouen —  cardinal-priest of SS. XII Apostoli, + June 7, 1361.

Consistory on September 17, 1361
 Fontanier de Vassal, O.F.M., patriarch of Grado —  cardinal-priest, + October 1361.
 Pierre Itier, bishop of Dax —  cardinal-priest of SS. IV Coronati, then (February 4, 1364) cardinal-bishop of Albano, + May 20, 1367.
 Jean de Blauzac, bishop of Nîmes —  cardinal-priest of S. Marco, then (September 1372) cardinal-bishop of Sabina, + July 6, 1379.
 Gilles Aycelin de Montaigu, bishop of Thérouanne, chancellor of France —  cardinal-priest of SS. Silvestro e Martino, then (September 22, 1368) cardinal-bishop of Frascati, + December 5, 1378.
 Androin de la Roche, O.S.B., abbot of Cluny — cardinal-priest of S. Marcello, + October 29, 1369.
 Étienne Aubert, papal nephew, bishop elect of Carcassonne —  cardinal-deacon of S. Maria in Aquiro, then (September 22, 1368) cardinal-priest of S. Lorenzo in Lucina, + September 29, 1369.
 Guillaume Bragose, bishop elect of Vabres —  cardinal-deacon of S. Giorgio, then (December 6, 1362) cardinal-priest of S. Lorenzo in Lucina, + in autumn 1367.
 Hugues de Saint-Martial, provost of Douai — cardinal-deacon of S. Maria in Portico, + 1403.

Bibliography 
Etienne Baluze: Vitae paparum avenionensium, I-II, ed. G. Mollat, 1914
Konrad Eubel, Hierarchia Catholica, vol. I, Münster 1913

Innocent 6
College of Cardinals
 Inn